Home Alone 2: Lost in New York is a 1992 American Christmas comedy film directed by Chris Columbus and written and produced by John Hughes. The sequel to the 1990 film Home Alone and the second film in the Home Alone franchise, the film stars Macaulay Culkin, Joe Pesci, Daniel Stern, John Heard, Tim Curry, Brenda Fricker, and Catherine O'Hara. It follows Kevin McCallister as he is separated from his family on their holiday vacation to Florida, this time in New York City where he has another encounter with the Wet Bandits after their escape during a prison riot.

Hughes finished writing the film by February 1991, after signing a six-picture deal with 20th Century Fox. Culkin's return was confirmed in May, and the rest of the cast was finalized soon after. Principal photography took place between December 1991 and May 1992, and was done on location in Illinois and New York, including at the Rockefeller Center and the original World Trade Center.

Home Alone 2: Lost in New York was theatrically released in the United States by 20th Century Fox on November 20, 1992. It received mixed-to-negative reviews from critics, who praised the performances while criticizing its darker tone and violence, as well as its similarities to the first film. The film grossed over $359 million worldwide, becoming the third-highest-grossing film of 1992. A stand-alone sequel with a new cast, Home Alone 3, was released in 1997. 

Home Alone 2: Lost in New York is the last Home Alone movie to feature the cast from the first film. However, Devin Ratray reprised his role as Buzz McCallister in the sixth film in the franchise Home Sweet Home Alone.

Plot

The McCallister family is preparing to spend Christmas in Miami, and gathers at Kate and Peter's Chicago home. Their youngest son, Kevin, views Florida as contradictory to Christmas, due to its tropical climate and lack of Christmas trees.

At a school pageant, during Kevin's solo, his older brother Buzz pranks him; Kevin retaliates by pushing him, which causes the entire choir to fall, ruining the pageant. At home, Buzz makes a false apology, which the family accepts, berating Kevin when he says he retaliated for Buzz humiliating him. Kevin insults his family for believing Buzz's lies and for spending Christmas in a tropical climate, and storms off to the attic, wishing to have his own vacation alone.

The next morning, the family oversleeps and must rush to the airport. Kevin is with them, but he becomes separated from them while carrying Peter's bag and accidentally boards a flight to New York City. Upon arrival, he decides to tour the city, but becomes frightened by a homeless woman tending to pigeons in Central Park. He uses Peter's credit card to check in at the Plaza Hotel, not knowing that the Wet Bandits have also reached the city after escaping from prison.

On Christmas Eve, Kevin visits a toy store whose kindly owner, Mr. Duncan, plans to donate the day's sale proceeds to a children's hospital. After Kevin makes a donation, Mr. Duncan gives him a pair of ceramic turtledoves in thanks, instructing him to give one to another person as a gesture of eternal friendship. The concierge at the Plaza confronts Kevin about his use of Peter's credit card, now reported as stolen; Kevin flees the hotel but is caught by the Wet Bandits. Marv mentions his and Harry's plan to rob the store before Kevin escapes in an encounter with a female passerby.

Earlier, upon landing in Miami, the McCallister family discover that Kevin is missing and file a police report. After the police trace Peter's credit card, the family flies immediately to New York. Meanwhile, Kevin goes to his uncle's townhouse, only to find it vacant and undergoing renovations. In Central Park, Kevin encounters and eventually befriends the pigeon lady, who takes him to Carnegie Hall. She explains how her life collapsed when her lover left her; Kevin encourages her to trust people again. After considering her advice that he perform a good deed to make up for his misdeeds, and recalling Mr. Duncan's intent to donate to the hospital, he decides to prevent the toy store robbery.

Kevin rigs the townhouse with booby traps, catches Harry and Marv in the process of robbing the store, and breaks its front window to set off the burglar alarm. After taking their picture, he lures them to the townhouse where they repeatedly injure themselves in the traps. Kevin evades them, calls the police from a pay phone to alert them to the pair's presence, and flees toward Central Park. Harry and Marv catch him after he slips on ice and prepare to kill him, but the pigeon lady throws a bucket of birdseed onto them, attracting a massive flock of pigeons and incapacitating the pair until the police arrive to arrest them. Kevin slips away, leaving photographic and tape-recorded evidence against Harry and Marv, and Mr. Duncan recovers the donation money and finds a note from Kevin explaining why he broke the window. The family arrives in New York, and Kate, remembering Kevin's fondness for Christmas trees, finds him making a wish at the Rockefeller Center Christmas Tree.

On Christmas morning, a truckload of free gifts arrives at the McCallisters' hotel room, sent from a grateful Mr. Duncan for foiling the robbery. Kevin reconciles with his family and gives one of his turtledoves to the pigeon lady, cementing their friendship.

Cast

Production

In February 1991, the Los Angeles Times reported that John Hughes was to sign a six-picture deal with 20th Century Fox; among the projects was a sequel to Home Alone. In May 1991, Culkin was paid $4.5 million plus 5 percent of the film's gross to appear in the sequel, compared to $110,000 for the original. The production budget was $28 million.

Principal photography took place from December 9, 1991 to May 1, 1992, over a course of 144 days; the film was shot in Winnetka, Illinois; O'Hare International Airport in Chicago; Evanston, Illinois; and New York City. According to the director, Chris Columbus, Donald Trump, the owner of the Plaza Hotel at the time, allowed the crew to shoot scenes in the hotel lobby in exchange for a cameo in the film in addition to the standard fee for film productions. Pesci said in the People interview, "I did sustain serious burns to the top of my head during the scene where Harry's hat is set on fire."

Music
John Williams returned to score Home Alone 2. While the film featured the first film's theme song "Somewhere in My Memory", it also contained its own theme entitled "Christmas Star". Two soundtrack albums of the film were released on November 20, 1992, with one featuring Williams' score and the other featuring contemporary Christmas songs featured in the film. Ten years later, a 2-disc Deluxe Edition of the film score soundtrack was released.

Release

Marketing
Numerous video games based on Home Alone 2 were released by THQ for such systems as the Sega Genesis, the Nintendo Entertainment System, the Super Nintendo Entertainment System, Game Boy and personal computers, mostly in late 1992. A separate hand-held game was released by Tiger Electronics. Numerous board games were also released, some based around play cards, while another was a close emulation of the classic Mouse Trap.

The Talkboy cassette recorder was produced as a tie-in for the movie by Tiger Electronics based on specifications provided by John Hughes and the movie studio, and sold particularly well after the film was released on home video. Additional promotional partners included American Airlines through which the McCallisters make their trip via the airline's two Boeing 767-200s, the Coca-Cola Company, Jack in the Box, Hardee's, and Roy Rogers Restaurants.

Home media

The film was first released by Fox Video on VHS and LaserDisc on July 27, 1993. It was later released on DVD on October 5, 1999 as a basic package. The film was released on Blu-ray on October 6, 2009 with no special features, and was released alongside Home Alone in a collection pack on October 5, 2010. The film was reissued again on DVD and Blu-ray on October 6, 2015, alongside all five Home Alone franchise films, titled Home Alone: 25th Anniversary Ultimate Collector's Christmas Edition.

Reception

Box office
Home Alone 2 opened with $31.1 million from 2,222 theaters, averaging $14,008 per site. It broke the short-lived record set one week earlier by Bram Stoker's Dracula for having the largest November opening weekend. The film went on to hold this record until 1994 when it was taken by Interview with the Vampire. Additionally, it achieved the highest opening weekend for a Chris Columbus film and would hold that record until it was surpassed by Harry Potter and the Sorcerer's Stone in 2001. It started off better than Home Alone, grossing $100 million in 24 days compared to 33 days for the original. However the final box office gross was lower with $173.6 million in the United States and Canada and a worldwide total of $359 million, compared to $476 million for the first film. The film was released in the United Kingdom on December 11, 1992, and topped the country's box office that weekend. The film is the third-highest-grossing film released in 1992 behind The Bodyguard and Aladdin. In the United States and Canada, it grossed more than The Bodyguard and ranked second.

Critical response
The site's critical consensus reads: "A change of venue – and more sentimentality and violence – can't obscure the fact that Home Alone 2: Lost in New York is a less inspired facsimile of its predecessor." On Metacritic, the film has a weighted average score of 46 out of 100 based on 22 critics, indicating "mixed or average reviews". Audiences polled by CinemaScore gave the film an average grade of "A−" on an A+ to F scale, a grade lower than the "A" earned by its predecessor.

Roger Ebert of the Chicago Sun-Times gave the film two out of four stars and stated that "cartoon violence is only funny in cartoons. Most of the live-action attempts to duplicate animation have failed, because when flesh-and-blood figures hit the pavement, we can almost hear the bones crunch, and it isn't funny." Kenneth Turan, reviewing for the Los Angeles Times, wrote: "Whatever was unforced and funny in the first film has become exaggerated here, whatever was slightly sentimental has been laid on with a trowel. The result, with some exceptions, plays like an over-elaborate parody of the first film, reminding us why we enjoyed it without being able to duplicate its appeal." Dave Kehr of the Chicago Tribune wrote the sequel "plays like a coarsened, self-parodying version of the original, in which the fantasy elements have become grubbier and more materialistic, the sentimentality more treacly and aggressive, and the slapstick violence—already astonishingly intense in the first film—even more graphic and sadistic." Brian Lowry of Variety noted the sequel's derivativeness when compared to the original film, but wrote the "action sequences are well-choreographed, if, perhaps, too mean-spirited even in light of their cartoonish nature".

Janet Maslin for The New York Times acknowledged that "Home Alone 2 may be lazily conceived, but it is staged with a sense of occasion and a lot of holiday cheer. The return of Mr. Culkin in this role is irresistible, even if this utterly natural comic actor has been given little new to do. Mr. Pesci and Mr. Stern bring great gusto to their characters' stupidity, to the point where they are far funnier just walking and talking than they are being hurt." Reviewing for Time magazine, Richard Schickel noted "Home Alone 2 precisely follows the formula that made its predecessor the biggest grossing comedy in human history. But no, it is not a drag, and it is not a rip-off. Look on it as a twice-told fairy tale." He praised Hughes and Chris Columbus and felt "the details of the situations are developed vividly and originally. And they are presented with an energy and a conviction that sequels usually lack." Duane Byrge of The Hollywood Reporter wrote that while the "sequel is merely a superimposition of the original, kids will be delighted" by it. He further praised Culkin as "breezily winning", felt Pesci and Stern deserved combat medals, and Curry served as "a terrific foil for Kevin's pranks".

In recent years, online reviewers have looked more favorably on the film. John Nugent of Empire magazine, in a 2022 article entitled 'Why Home Alone 2: Lost In New York Is Better Than Home Alone', argued that the film was "a sequel that effectively also functions as a remake, a film that recognises the greatness of what came before and wisely hews as close to that winning formula as possible." Also writing in 2022, Reid Goldberg of Collider noted: "A significant part of the film's appeal... is that it's unapologetic in taking everything they loved about the first film to a higher level."

Other media

Sequels

A third film with a new cast, Home Alone 3, followed in 1997. Two television movies, Home Alone 4: Taking Back the House and Home Alone: The Holiday Heist, aired in 2002 and 2012, respectively. Home Sweet Home Alone, the sixth film in the series, was released in 2021.

Novelization
Home Alone 2 was novelized by Todd Strasser and published by Scholastic in 1992 to coincide with the film. The "point" version, which has the same storyline, was also novelized by A.L. Singer. It has an ISBN of 0-590-45717-9. An audiobook version was also released read by Tim Curry (who played the concierge in the film).

As in the novelization of the first film, the McCallisters live in Oak Park, Illinois and the crooks are named as Harry Lime and Marv Murchins. The novel also takes place one year after the events of the first film, but the ages of Kevin and his siblings are given as being two years older than the first film.

In the beginning of the novelization, a prologue, which ends up being Marv's nightmare in prison, he and Harry sneak away from the cops and return to Kevin's house to seek revenge on Kevin. Kevin bolts into the garage with Marv and Harry in hot pursuit. Harry and Marv end up triggering extra traps that Kevin had set up in the garage. Kevin watches as Marv ends up triggering a trap where a running lawnmower falls on his head (this was a trap featured in Home Alone 3).

See also
 List of Christmas films
 List of films featuring fictional films

References

External links

 
 
 
 

1992 films
1992 comedy films
1990s English-language films
1990s adventure comedy films
1990s screwball comedy films
American adventure comedy films
American Christmas comedy films
American screwball comedy films
American slapstick comedy films
American sequel films
Compositions by Leslie Bricusse
Films about missing people
Films set in 1992
Films set in Chicago
Films set in hotels
Films set in Miami
Films set in New York City
Films shot in Chicago
Films shot in Los Angeles
Films shot in New York City
Home Alone (franchise)
20th Century Fox films
Films directed by Chris Columbus
Films produced by John Hughes (filmmaker)
Films scored by John Williams
Films with screenplays by John Hughes (filmmaker)
1990s Christmas comedy films
Cultural depictions of Donald Trump
American children's comedy films
Films about mother–son relationships
Films about vacationing
1990s American films